Oran is an unincorporated community in Shelby County, in the U.S. state of Ohio.

History
A post office called Oran was established in 1873, and remained in operation until 1904. In 1913, Oran had around 38 inhabitants.

References

Unincorporated communities in Shelby County, Ohio
Unincorporated communities in Ohio